Antonio Servillo (born 12 November 1964 in Padova), Italian painter of contemporary art.

Biography 
Self-taught Italian painter, born in Padova from a neapolitan family on November 12, 1964.
He paints episodes from his childhood in the small town of Campania where he lived with his family of origin, through a first period as a draftsman, then as a madonnaro, he arrives at a surrealist and metaphysical painting in the eighties. Moving to Rome in 1984, he joined the historic Cento Pittori via Margutta, here he had the opportunity to meet established artists such as Mario Schifano and Paolo Salvati. His works are halfway between visions from the future, of a world in which man will only become a performer, a subject of the realm of the mechanics of those androids that in the present time he is trying to create. Exhibits in personal exhibitions in Rome, Bologna and Naples, numerous exhibitions in the street.

Bibliography 
 Catalog, personal exhibition, Napoli, Hotel Villa Giulia, luglio 1999.
 Catalog, personal exhibition, Follonica, Pinacoteca Civica, luglio 2003.
 Annuario Arte Moderna artisti contemporanei 2004, ACCA in.. Arte Editrice pp. 509
 Annuario Arte Moderna artisti contemporanei 2005, ACCA in.. Arte Editrice pp. 254–256/2.
 Le voci dell'oblio, by Luca Tescaroli, illustrations by Antonio Servillo. 
 Catalogo "Arte a Palazzo" dinamiche del contemporaneo, pp. 217–218, Bologna, 2016, di Galleria Fantini Concept.
 Catalog of Modern Art No 53, in Giovanni Faccenda, "The Italian Artist from the early twentieth century to today"(Gli Artisti Italiani dal Primo Novecento ad Oggi), Giorgio Mondadori, Milan, 2019, pp. 443, 74. 
 Catalog, Il mondo e le sue ombre: mostra personale di Antonio Servillo, Roma, Tartaglia Arte, dal 22 al 30 aprile 2001.
 Catalog, Artisti '20, Annuario internazionale d'arte contemporanea, by Vittorio Sgarbi, Philippe Daverio, pp. 410, 1109, 1308, Giorgio Mondadori, 2020. 
 Monograph, Antonio Servillo, by Marta Lock, Roma,2020.
 Catalog, Quando la fantasia diventa arte : Biennale 2021, 2. edizione, concorso internazionale di pittura, by Inter@rt.
 Via Margutta Storia della Strada degli Artisti e dei Cento Pittori, in Luigi Salvatori, Roberta Imperatori, Eventi d'Arte Cento Pittori via Margutta, Roma, 2021.
 Monograph, La produzione pittorica di Antonio Servillo, by Michela Ramadori, Roma, 2021.

References

External links 

 
 Biography on Artprice.com
 Biography on Vittoria Gallery

20th-century Italian painters
Italian male painters
21st-century Italian painters
Italian contemporary artists
1964 births
Living people
20th-century Italian male artists
21st-century Italian male artists